Maria's worm lizard (Blanus mariae) is an amphisbaenian species in the family Blanidae. The species is endemic to the Iberian Peninsula.

Geographic range
Blanus mariae is found in the southwestern Iberian Peninsula, mainly in the southern half of Portugal and in the spanish autonomous communities of Extremadura and western Andalusia.

Taxonomy
Blanus mariae forms a cryptic species complex with Blanus cinereus.

Etymology
The specific name, mariae, is in honour of Maria del Rosario Aguilar Tortajada (1914–2002), the grandmother of Eva María Albert, one of the scientists who described this species.

Description
The body colour is pale pink to dark brilliant purple, with a reticulate pattern caused by the inter-segmental sutures.

References

Further reading
Albert, Eva M.; Fernández, Adrián (2009). "Evidence of cryptic speciation in a fossorial reptile: description of a new species of Blanus (Squamata: Amphisbaenia: Blanidae) from the Iberian Peninsula". Zootaxa 2234: 56-68. (Blanus mariae, new species).

mariae
Reptiles described in 2009
Taxa named by Eva María Albert
Taxa named by Adrián Fernández (herpetologist)
Endemic reptiles of the Iberian Peninsula
Lizards of Europe